Peterman Run is a tributary of West Branch Fishing Creek in Sullivan County and Columbia County, in Pennsylvania, in the United States. Glacial till and bedrock consisting of shale and sandstone can be found along the stream. It is considered to be impaired by atmospheric deposition and metals.

Course
Peterman Run begins on a plateau in Davidson Township, Sullivan County. It flows south-southwest for a few tenths of a mile before leaving the plateau and flowing down its side, descending steeply. The stream continues flowing south-southwest. After several tenths of a mile, it exits Sullivan County.

Upon exiting Sullivan County, Peterman Run enters Sugarloaf Township, Columbia County. It turns south for a short distance before reaching the bottom of the slope and turning east. After several hundred feet, the stream turns south-southeast. After approximately a thousand feet (three hundred meters), it reaches its confluence with West Branch Fishing Creek.

Hydrology, geography, and geology
The impaired waters of the stream comprise approximately 4.01 percent of the total impaired waters in Sullivan County within the watersheds of West Branch Fishing Creek and East Branch Fishing Creek.

A significant portion of the lower reaches of Peterman Run is on a glacial till known as the Wisconsinan Bouldery Till. The surface is largely covered with boulders and it is a diamict. Alluvial terrace also occurs near the stream's lower reaches, in the valley of West Branch Fishing Creek. Bedrock consisting of sandstone and shale can be found in the stream's middle reaches.

Watershed
The stream is entirely within the United States Geological Survey quadrangle of Elk Grove. The stream's watershed is part of the Upper Susquehanna-Lackawanna drainage basin.

Peterman Run is in the vicinity of Pennsylvania State Game Lands Number 13.

History
Peterman Run was entered into the Geographic Names Information System on August 2, 1979. Its identifier in the Geographic Names Information System is 1183619.

Peterman Run was listed as impaired in both 2002 and 2004.

See also
Rough Run, next tributary of West Branch Fishing Creek going downstream
List of tributaries of Fishing Creek (North Branch Susquehanna River)

References

Rivers of Sullivan County, Pennsylvania
Tributaries of Fishing Creek (North Branch Susquehanna River)
Rivers of Pennsylvania
Rivers of Columbia County, Pennsylvania